The 2022–23 Taoyuan Leopards season was the franchise's 2nd season, its second season in the T1 League, its 2nd in Taoyuan City. The Leopards are coached by Liu Chia-Fa in his second year as head coach. On December 19, 2022, Su Yi-Chieh announced that he resigned from general manager. On December 21, the Leopards named Chang Chien-Wei, the chief executive officer of the Taoyuan Leopards, as their interim general manager.

Draft 

 Reference：

The fifth place, Taoyuan Leopards, and the sixth place, Tainan TSG GhostHawks, in the 2021–22 season acquired two selections in the first round. On August 4, 2022, the second rounder, Lin Tzu-Wei had joined Taoyuan Pilots of the P. League+.

Standings

Roster 

<noinclude>

Game log

2022 Interleague Play

Group match

Quarterfinals

Preseason

Regular season

Player Statistics 
<noinclude>

Regular season

 Reference：

Transactions

Trades

On loan

Free agents

Re-signed

Additions

Subtractions

Awards

Import of the Month

All-Star Game Awards

References 

2022–23 T1 League season by team
Taoyuan Leopards seasons